Ria Lina (born 1980) is a British comedian, actress and writer. She has appeared on Yesterday, Today & The Day Before, Mock the Week, Steph's Packed Lunch, The Now Show, The News Quiz, Sky News, and Have I Got News for You. In 2003, she won an Ethnic Multicultural Media Academy award for Best Comedian.

Early life 

Lina's mother is from the Philippines and her father from Germany. She attended an American school in the Netherlands from the age of 14.

Lina has three children, and was diagnosed with autism as an adult.

Stand-up 
In 2003, Lina was a runner up at the first Funny Women Awards.

Lina has taken five shows to the Edinburgh Festival Fringe. School of Riason was nominated for the Amused Moose Laughter Awards, and contained one of Dave's Top 10 Jokes of the Fringe, and was later broadcast on BBC Radio 4 in 2016. Lina's Dear Daughter won the Best Comedy award at the Greater Manchester Fringe. Her other shows include Taboo Raider, Thpethial and It's Not Easy Being Yellow.

Television and radio 
Appearances include Yesterday Today and the Day Before, Mock the Week, Steph's Packed Lunch, The Dog Ate My Homework, Sky News, Talk Radio, Talk Radio Europe, The Now Show, The News Quiz, Times Radio and Breaking the News.

Further TV work includes Jongleurs Live, The World Stands Up, Sweet 'n' Sour Comedy, Meet The Blogs, Malai Monologues, the film short Christie, and the documentary, A Bit of Oriental.

She also voiced the character Perun in Xenoblade Chronicles 2.

Lina appeared in and won Episode 4 of the 21st series of BBC Celebrity Mastermind, broadcast in January 2023.

Awards 
 Winner of the Best Comedy Award Greater Manchester Fringe 2016 for her show 'Dear Daughter'
 Finalist Amused Moose Comedy Award 2014
 Winner of the Best Comedy/Comedian Ethnic Multicultural Media Academy Award 2003
 Winner of the King of Kings Comedy Store Award 2003
 BBC New Comedy Awards 2003 semi-finalist
 Daily Telegraph Open Mic Award 2002 finalist
 Wilkinson Sword Cutting Edge of Comedy 2002 finalist

References

External links
Official website

Living people
Alumni of the University of London
Alumni of the University of St Andrews
English award winners
English stand-up comedians
English television actresses
English television writers
English women comedians
British women television writers
People on the autism spectrum
British people of German descent
British people of Filipino descent
1980 births